Ebbe Blichfeldt is a Danish wheelchair racer living in Switzerland who has competed internationally in the Paralympic Games and other parathletic events, in the T54 classification for athletes with spinal cord injuries who compete in wheelchairs. He also works as an occupational therapist.

Blichfeldt was paralysed at age 13 as a side effect of cancer, and began wheelchair racing in 2001. His competitions have included competing for Denmark at the 2008 Summer Paralympics, and for Denmark at the 2016 Summer Paralympics, where he qualified as the only Danish wheelchair racer, and earned big cheers from the crowd despite finishing last in his heat in the 5000m race. He placed third in the wheelchair category of the Dublin Marathon in 2018, and second in the 2018 Rome Marathon. He has held the Danish records for 1500m and 5000m wheelchair racing.

Blichfeldt moved to Switzerland in 2009, and trains at the Swiss Paraplegic Centre in Nottwil along with other parathletes including champion wheelchair racer Marcel Hug. He is sponsored by OA Opbyg A/S, an axle construction firm in Karlslunde.

Results
Blichfeldt's events and results include:
2003 London Marathon: 10th
2008 Summer Paralympics: 1500m: 35th; 5000m: 25th; marathon: 28th
2011 IPC Athletics World Championships: 1500m: 25th; marathon: 18th
2012 IPC Athletics European Championships: 1500m: 5th; 5000m: bronze medal
2014 IPC Athletics European Championships: 1500m: DNF; 5000m: 7th
2015 London Marathon: 16th
2015 IPC Athletics World Championships: marathon: 16th
2016 Summer Paralympics: 1500m: 8th in heat; 5000m: 9th in heat
2018 Rome Marathon: silver medal
2018 Dublin Marathon: bronze medal

References

Year of birth missing (living people)
Living people
Danish wheelchair racers
Male wheelchair racers
Paralympic competitors for Denmark
Athletes (track and field) at the 2008 Summer Paralympics
Athletes (track and field) at the 2016 Summer Paralympics
Wheelchair category Paralympic competitors
Occupational therapists
People with paraplegia